Brock O'Hurn (born August 19, 1991), is an American model, actor, fitness trainer, and producer. He gained recognition through his Instagram account for popularizing the man bun. He has also founded two companies, O'Hurn Media Inc. and Outlaw Logic Pictures (2021).

Early life
O'Hurn was born in Sacramento, California, the second oldest of cleaning company owner Paige (née Hillenbrand) and Adam Hurn, who separated when he was nine years old. He has four siblings, sisters Aspyn and Carly, and brothers Dagan and Drake. He is of English, Irish, French and German descent. Brock added the O' because he says his family's original name in Ireland was O'Hearn and he wanted to get back to its roots. O'Hurn attended nine different schools in Orange County, Palm Springs, and San Bernardino, California, causing his education to suffer.

At the age of 12, he knew he wanted to become an actor. O'Hurn starred in his first play as "Jack" from 'Jack and the Beanstalk'.

O'Hurn swept floors and bagged bread at a bakery. After graduation, O'Hurn briefly worked with his uncle's company that installed heating and cooling systems before getting a job in Mission Viejo, Orange County for Abercrombie & Fitch and subsequently working as a salesman for True Religion, which taught him the value of customer service and helped him overcome his natural shyness.
In an 2015 interview with Buzzfeed, he said: "Don't get me wrong. I like Abercrombie. There's nothing wrong with them. They're awesome. It's just... That wasn't my dream, you know. That's not my goal. That's not what I was passionate about."

He used to manage a moving company with his brother, when he was 18.

O'Hurn started training clients online in 2015, charging $100 to $150 for a month's worth of programs, which is what he was living on when he moved to Los Angeles.

Career

O'Hurn gained international fame through his Instagram account where he was recognized for his height, physique and for popularizing the man bun. He admitted that he was confused by the sudden fame saying, "I was like, 'Is this a joke? Do I just have to keep lifting people? This is my life?'" His mother's boyfriend, David "Dave" Harris, is his manager and also the Vice President of his company O'Hurn Media Inc. since January 2016.

In 2015, he worked for LG Electronics to model for their LG Tone Active Headphones. O'Hurn worked with Tyler Perry in his 2016 film Boo! A Madea Halloween, making his acting debut as frat boy Horse. He reprised the role in the sequel Boo 2! A Madea Halloween (2017). He also stars in Perry's television series Too Close to Home.

In 2020, he worked as the cover model for the books and audiobooks "Blood of Zeus"  and "Heart of Fire", the "Blood of Zeus" book series by Meredith Wild and Angel Payne.
The third book and audiobook "Fate of Storms" was released in 2021, where he also worked as a cover model.

He played the role of "Chris" in the 2021 horror movie 'The Resort', where he also loved working as a producer.

In June 2021, he founded Outlaw Logic Pictures, a production and media company based out of Los Angeles, CA.

Philanthropy
O'Hurn supports the Black lives matter movement. In an interview with the "Muscle and Health" magazine he said 'at least one thousand of us gathered to ride [motorcycles] for change'. He also supports the Dave Thomas Foundation for Adoption  and local charities.

In 2019, he supported the "Million Dollar Vegan" charity that was going to donate $1,000,000, if they could collect enough signatures to make the pope become a vegan. He partnered with the LAFD for another charity.

Personal life
Since he started with fitness at the age of 15, he has been working out every day, sometimes twice a day. He has been living in Hollywood for at least 8 years, when the first place he moved into was a room from a friend on Hollywood Boulevard. He also enjoys reading and riding his Harley Davidson.

Acting credits

Film

Television

Music video

References

External links

Living people
1991 births
Male models from California
21st-century American male actors
Male actors from California
American male film actors
American people of English descent
American people of Irish descent
American people of French descent
American people of German descent